João Filipe Gaspar Rodrigues (born 2 November 1971) is a Portuguese windsurfer. He competed in every Summer Olympic Games from 1992 to 2016 with the best result of sixth place in 2004. 

Rodrigues started sailing aged nine and racing competitively at the age of eleven; in 1987 he was included to the national team. In 1995, he won his first major title at the Mistral World Championships, in Port Elizabeth, South Africa. The same year he also graduated from a five-year course in engineering and was awarded the Nobre Guedes Olympic Medal by the Portuguese Olympic Committee. In the following two years, Rodrigues won the European Championships in the Mistral class. In May 2008, he added a third European title to his record, this time in the Neil Pryde RS:X class.

Rodrigues won a silver medal in the masters fleet at the 2009 IWA Junior, Youth and Masters World championships which took place at Weymouth and Portland sailing academy which is the venue for the windsurfing and sailing at the 2012 Olympic games.

In 2011 Rodrigues completed the longest non-stop ocean crossing on a windsurfing board when he sailed 160 nautical miles from Madeira to Selvagem Grande. He did it to celebrate his 40th birthday and attract attention to the Parque Natural de Madeira, Portugal's oldest national park. 
His brother Luís competed for Portugal in sailing at the 2012 World Championships.

Olympics
Despite being the most physical of sailing discipline his biggest achievement is the length of his professional windsurfing career competing in seven consecutive Worlds over a 24 year span. He was Team Portugal national flag bearer in the 2016 Summer Olympics Parade of Nations.

References

External links

 
 
 
 
 2009 IWA World Championships Report
 2009 IWA World Championships Official Website

1971 births
Living people
People from Santa Cruz, Madeira
Madeiran sportspeople
Portuguese windsurfers
Olympic sailors of Portugal
Portuguese male sailors (sport)
Sailors at the 1992 Summer Olympics – Lechner A-390
Sailors at the 1996 Summer Olympics – Mistral One Design
Sailors at the 2000 Summer Olympics – Mistral One Design
Sailors at the 2004 Summer Olympics – Mistral One Design
Sailors at the 2008 Summer Olympics – RS:X
Sailors at the 2012 Summer Olympics – RS:X
Sailors at the 2016 Summer Olympics – RS:X